William Leigh  (b Rushall, Herefordshire 1752 – d Hereford 1808) was an Anglican priest in the late 18th and early 19th centuries.

Leigh was educated at Harrow and Trinity College, Cambridge.
  He held livings at Little Plumstead, Witton and Brundall.

References

1752 births
1809 deaths
People from Herefordshire
People educated at Harrow School
Alumni of Trinity College, Cambridge
Church of England deans
Deans of Hereford